C. hastata may refer to:
 Capparis hastata, a plant species
 Chlamys hastata, the spear scallop or spiny scallop, a bivalve species

Synonyms 
 Cacalia hastata, a synonym for Parasenecio hastatus, a plant species

See also 
 Hastata (disambiguation)